Lehri is a town and union council located in Sibi District, Balochistan, Pakistan. Lehri Tehsil was created along with Bhag Tehsil to become Lehri District, a separate district in 2013; which it has later on merged back into Sibi District in 2018 The town has altitude of 107 m (354 ft).

Lehri is located at 29°10'56"N 68°12'36"E.

References

Populated places in Lehri District

Union councils of Balochistan, Pakistan